The following lists events that happened during 1923 in New Zealand.

Incumbents

Regal and viceregal
 Head of State  – George V
 Governor-General – John Jellicoe, Viscount Jellicoe

Government
The 21st New Zealand Parliament begins. The Reform Party governs as a minority with the support of independents.

Speaker of the House – Charles Statham (Independent)
Prime Minister – William Massey
Minister of Finance – William Massey
Minister of External Affairs – Ernest Lee until 13 January, then Francis Bell from 7 June

Parliamentary opposition
Leader of the Opposition – Thomas Wilford (Liberal Party)

Judiciary
 Chief Justice – Sir Robert Stout

Main centre leaders
Mayor of Auckland – James Gunson
Mayor of Wellington – Robert Wright
Mayor of Christchurch – Henry Thacker, succeeded by James Flesher
Mayor of Dunedin – James Douglas, succeeded by Harold Tapley

Events 
 28 March – The Tauranga by-election is won by Charles Edward MacMillan (Reform Party)
 March – The inflation rate in New Zealand reaches its lowest recorded value, −15.3 per cent
 1 May – The Oamaru by-election is won by John MacPherson (Liberal Party)
 14 June − The New Zealand Permanent Air Force, the forerunner of the Royal New Zealand Air Force, is established
 6 July – The Ongarue railway disaster results in the deaths of 17 passengers when the overnight Auckland-Wellington Express runs into a landslip at Ongarue near Taumarunui
 4 August – Opening of the Otira Tunnel on the Midland Line
 15 December – The British and Intercolonial Exhibition opens in Hokitika

Undated
 New Zealand gains the right to conduct its own trade negotiations independently of Britain
 The Ross Dependency is claimed by Britain and placed under New Zealand administration
 The Royal Forest and Bird Protection Society of New Zealand is formed
 The Royal Navy battlecruiser HMS New Zealand, funded by the New Zealand government as a gift to Britain before World War I, is broken up for scrap

Arts and literature

See 1923 in art, 1923 in literature, :Category:1923 books

Music

Production of the musical "Tutankhamen" by L.P.Leary at His Majesty's Theatre in Auckland. Music by Eric Waters.

See: 1923 in music

Radio

A set of Broadcasting regulations are issued under the Post And Telegraph Act 1920. Under the new regulations the country is divided into four numerical transmission regions. The regulations also stipulate that the owner of a receiving set is to pay an annual licence of five shillings while permission to transmit costs two pounds.

See: Public broadcasting in New Zealand

Film
 The Romance of Sleepy Hollow
See:  1923 in film, List of New Zealand feature films, Cinema of New Zealand, :Category:1923 films

Sport

Chess
 The 32nd National Chess Championship is held in Christchurch, and is won by John Boyd Dunlop of Oamaru (his third title)

Cricket
 Plunket Shield

Football
 The inaugural competition for the Chatham Cup is won by Seacliff AFC (Otago)
 The New Zealand team tours Australia, playing 16 matches:
 24 May, at Granville – lose 1–3 vs Granville
 26 May, at Sydney – draw 2–2 vs New South Wales
 29 May, at Newcastle – lose 0–2 vs Newcastle
 2 June, at Ipswich – win 4–2 vs Ipswich / West Moreton
 4 June, at Brisbane – win 3–1 vs Queensland
 6 June, at Nambour – win 2–0 vs North Coast
 9 June, at Brisbane – lose 1–2 vs Australia
 13 June, at Cessnock – lose 1–2 vs South Maitland
 16 June, at Sydney – win 3–2 vs Australia
 20 June, at Sydney – win 3–4 vs Metropolis
 23 June, at Sydney – win 3–1 vs Granville
 25 June, at Sydney – draw 1–1 vs New South Wales
 30 June, at Newcastle – win 4–1 vs Australia
 3 July, at Weston – lose 1–4 vs South Maitland
 7 July, at Wollongong – lose 0–2 vs South Coast
 11 July, at Lithgow – win 4–0 vs Western Districts
 Provincial league champions:
 Auckland – North Shore AFC (Devonport)
 Canterbury – Sunnyside
 Hawke's Bay – Whakatu
 Nelson – Athletic
 Otago – HSOB
 South Canterbury – Albion Rovers
 Southland – Nightcaps
 Taranaki – Hawera
 Wanganui – Eastown Workshops
 Wellington – Waterside

Golf
 The 10th New Zealand Open championship is won by A. Brooks.
 The 27th National Amateur Championships are held in Wanganui:
 Men – J. Goss (Wanganui)
 Women – E. Vigor Brown (Napier)

Horse racing

Harness racing
 New Zealand Trotting Cup – Great Hope
 Auckland Trotting Cup – Blue Mountain King

Thoroughbred racing
 New Zealand Cup – Rouen
 Auckland Cup – Te Kara / Muraahi (dead heat)
 Wellington Cup – Rapine
 New Zealand Derby – Black Ronald
 ARC Great Northern Derby – Enthusiasm

Lawn bowls
The national outdoor lawn bowls championships are held in Auckland.
 Men's singles champion – M. Walker (Ponsonby Bowling Club)
 Men's pair champions – W. McCallum, T. Edwards (skip) (Temuka Bowling Club)
 Men's fours champions – R.S. Somervell, J.F. Hosking, V.P. Casey, A. Parsons (skip) (Ponsonby Bowling Club)

Rugby union
 A New South Wales team tours New Zealand, playing three matches against the New Zealand team. New Zealand wins all three: 19–9, 34–6 and 38–11.

Births

January–February
2 January – Joe McManemin, athletics coach, sports administrator
 6 January – Norman Kirk, politician
 11 January – Charles Philip Littlejohn, parliamentary officer
 15 January – Nick Unkovich, lawn bowls player
 27 January – Robert Burchfield, lexicographer
 11 February – Bryce Rope, rugby union player and coach

March–April
 1 March – Stephen Jelicich, architect, historian
 2 March
 Ron Elvidge, rugby union player
 Don Taylor, cricketer
 12 March – James Godwin, war crimes investigator
 13 March – Travers Hardwick, rugby league player and coach
 24 March – Poul Gnatt, ballet dancer and ballet master
 26 March – Ronald Dobson, rugby union player
 27 March – Donald Murdoch, cricketer
 31 March – Lawrie Miller, cricketer
 6 April – Rina Moore, doctor
 7 April
 Lindsay Daen, sculptor
 Russell Stone, historian
 14 April – Stan Cowman, cricket umpire
 16 April – Thomas Freeman, cricketer
 17 April – Ken Mudford, motorcycle racer
 18 April – Allan Deane, cricketer
 26 April – Harold Nelson, athlete
 29 April – Jean Herbison, academic, university chancellor

May–June
 17 May – Doug Ottley, association footballer
 26 May
 Bill Meates, rugby union player
 Thomas Paulay, earthquake engineer, academic
 4 June – Olga Stringfellow, journalist and author
 7 June – Peter Sutton, Anglican bishop
 19 June – Rex Orr, rugby union player
 25 June – Margaret Reid, Presbyterian minister
 30 June – Melvin Day, artist

July–August
 8 July – Margaret di Menna, microbiologist
 13 July – Max Lewis, cricketer
 14 July – Noel Chambers, swimmer
 16 July
 Richard Bolt, air force officer
 Terry Harris, water polo player
 18 July
 John Morton, marine zoologist, theologian, conservationist
 JJ Stewart, rugby union coach and administrator, politician
 26 July – Betty Gilderdale, children's author
 28 July – Bill Sevesi, musician
 9 August – Bob Neilson, rugby league player
 11 August – Roy Roper, rugby union player
 12 August – Janet Holm, environmental activist, historian
 14 August – Jack Luxton, politician
 15 August – Norm Jones, politician
 28 August – Maurice Casey, jurist

September–October
 9 September – Des Christian, rugby union player and coach
 19 September – Bob Sorenson, rugby union player and coach, cricketer
 29 September – Vernon McArley, cricketer
 3 October – Jack McLean, rugby union and rugby league player
 4 October – Lachie Grant, rugby union player
 9 October
 Bob Fenton, politician
 Ronald Tremain, composer, music academic
 11 October – Ed Nichols, alpine skier
 15 October
 Joyce Carpenter, diver
 Jim McCormick, rugby union player
 18 October – Rob Talbot, politician
 20 October – Mike Minogue, politician
 29 October
 David Kear, geologist, science administrator
 Ted Thorne, naval officer

November–December
 1 November – Peter Mahon, jurist
 4 November – Joan Hatcher, cricketer
 5 November – Frederick Stanley, cricketer
 9 November – Marion Robinson, physiologist and nutritionist
 10 November – Brian Ashby, Roman Catholic bishop
 11 November – Sonja Davies, trade unionist, peace activist, politician
 13 November – Austen Gittos, fencer
 17 November
 Dick Scott, historian, journalist
 Bert Sutcliffe, cricketer
 18 November – Neville Pickering, politician
 20 November – Robert Harwood, cricketer
 22 November – Guy Doleman, actor
 28 November – Eric Heath, cartoonist
 2 December – Andy Keyworth, master mariner
 6 December – Karl Sim, art forger
 13 December – Richard Campion, theatre director
 14 December – Bob Quickenden, association footballer
 17 December – John Darwin, statistician
 20 December – Arthur Mills, cricketer
 24 December – Bert Cook, rugby union and rugby league player

Deaths

January–March
 9 January – Katherine Mansfield, writer (born 1888)
 14 January – Frederick Radcliffe, photographer (born 1863)
 28 January – Alfred Holdship, cricketer (born 1867)
 6 February – William Thomas Jennings, politician (born 1854)
 22 February – Sir William Herries, politician (born 1859)
 17 March – Daniel Cooper, convicted baby farmer and illegal abortionist (born 1881)
 25 March – John Patterson, politician, businessman (born 1855)
 26 March – William Wescombe Corpe, sawmiller, dairy manufacturer (born 1836)

April–June
 3 April
 Charles H. Mills, politician (born 1843)
 Arthur Seymour, politician (born 1832)
 4 April – Charles Curtis, storekeeper, local-body politician (born 1850)
 12 April
 William Collins, politician (born 1853)
 Randell McDonnell, cricketer (born 1843)
 27 April – Gordon Millington, cricketer (born 1848)
 7 May – Walter Dinnie, police commissioner (born 1850)
 9 May – John Fuller, singer and theatrical company manager (born 1850)
 21 May – Leopold Prime, cricketer (born 1884)

July–September
 8 July – Henry Lawson, cricketer (born 1862)
 16 July – Sir William Fraser, politician (born 1840)
 27 July – William Dawson, brewer, politician (born 1852)
 3 August – Frederick Fulton, cricketer (born 1859)
 8 September – Thomas Mahoney, architect (born 1854)
 23 September – Sarah Higgins, midwife, writer (born 1830)
 26 September – Hoani Te Whatahoro Jury, Ngāti Kahungunu scholar, recorder, interpreter (born 1841)

October–December
 8 October – Angus Stuart, rugby union player (born 1858)
 15 October – Thomas Frederic Cheeseman, botanist (born 1846)
 17 October – William Meares, cricketer (born 1848)
 10 November – John Stallworthy, politician (born 1854)
 11 November – Robert Murdoch, malacologist (born 1861)
 25 November – Sydney Callaway, cricketer (born 1868)
 29 November – Gilbert Mair, soldier, interpreter, public servant (born 1843)
 11 December – Joseph Maddison, architect (born 1850)
 14 December – Michael Godby, cricketer (born 1850)

See also
History of New Zealand
List of years in New Zealand
Military history of New Zealand
Timeline of New Zealand history
Timeline of New Zealand's links with Antarctica
Timeline of the New Zealand environment

References

External links

Events of the Past Year as compiled by The New Zealand Herald